The Huai River, formerly romanized as the Hwai, is a major river in China. It is located about midway between the Yellow River and Yangtze, the two longest rivers and largest drainage basins in China, and like them runs from west to east. Historically draining directly into the Yellow Sea, floods have changed the course of the river such that it now primarily discharges into the Yangtze. The Huai is notoriously vulnerable to flooding.

The Qinling–Huaihe Line, formed by the Huai River and the Qin Mountains, is sometimes regarded as the geographical dividing line between Northern and southern China. This line approximates the  January isotherm and the  isohyet in China.

Course 
The Huai River originates in Tongbai Mountain in Henan province. It flows through southern Henan, northern Anhui, and northern Jiangsu where it pools into Lake Hongze.
Nowadays the Huai River then runs southwards as the Sanhe River by way of the Gaoyou Lake and Shaobo Lake emptying into Yangtze River at Sanjiangying (三江营) near Yangzhou.

There is also a passage called the Huaihe Sea Entryway and Subei Irrigation Canal that passes Huai'an empties into the sea at Biandan Port.  A separate course runs north by way of the Huaimu River and Huai Shu River and connects the Huai River system with the Xinyi River (part of the Yishusi River system) which exits into the sea at Guanyun in Lianyungang.

In part to circumvent flooding, in Jiangsu province the Huai river system is interconnected with different waterways and thereby forms part of the Grand Canal.

History

Historically, the Huai River entered the Yellow Sea at Yunti Pass (modern day Yunti Village, in Huangwei Town of Xiangshui County) through a broad and level lower course. It was long used to irrigate the surrounding farmlands, and was the center of an extensive network of canals and tributaries.
Beginning in 1194, however, the Yellow River to the north repeatedly changed its course southwards to run into the Huai River. The resulting silting was so heavy that after the Yellow River changed back to its northerly course for the most recent time in 1897, the geography of the Huai River basin was changed significantly by the creation of new high lands, lakes, and the built-up silt of the Yellow River's historical southern course. As a result, water from the midsection of the river could not easily flow into the lower section, while water in the lower section could not find an outlet to the sea. The problem worsened in the Second World War, when the Nationalist government, in an attempt to check the pace of the Japanese invasion, flooded the lower Huai basin by opening the Yellow River's southern levee. The main stem of the Yellow River flowed through the levee breach for the next nine years, further disrupting the Huai river system.

The result of these changes was that water from the Huai River pooled up into Lake Hongze, and then ran southwards towards the Yangtze River. Major and minor floods occurred frequently, with the area suffering droughts in between floods. In the 450 years to 1950, the Huai River saw, on average, 94 major floods per century.

Attempts to solve the Huai River's problems have focused on building outlets for the Huai River into the Yangtze River and the sea. Currently, the major part of the river's flow enters the Yangtze River via Lake Hongze. The North Jiangsu Main Irrigation Canal also diverts some of its water along its old historical course to the sea, and is planned to be upgraded with a new parallel channel. Several former tributaries also carry some water to the sea.

Tributaries
There are many tributaries of the Huai River.

The main tributaries on the Huai river  (listed from upstream to downstream) are as follows:

References

External links 

Huai River

 
Rivers of Jiangsu
Rivers of Henan
Rivers of Anhui
Tributaries of the Yangtze River